Tong Wen Tang is a Firefox browser extension that converts Chinese-language web pages between Traditional and Simplified Chinese characters. Thanks to the extension, Chinese-language users can access content written in the other writing system. According to records in forums of Mozilla Taiwan, Tong Wen Tang was firstly developed by Hashao (哈少), a mainland Chinese netizen. However, the edition supported only the Mozilla Firefox 0.9.

Softcup, a Taiwanese netizen, subsequently developed the New Tong Wen Tang. The browser extension is released under version 2 of the GNU General Public License.

Besides the Traditional-Simplified Chinese character conversion and zooming function, it can also directly input converted content of web pages into the clipboard.

References

External links
New Tong Wen Tang

Chinese language
Free Firefox WebExtensions